Halo crater is a small crater in Mare Cognitum on the Moon.  The name of the crater was formally adopted by the IAU in 1973.

The Apollo 12 astronauts Pete Conrad and Alan Bean landed the Lunar Module (LM) Intrepid north of Halo crater on November 24, 1969.   To the north of Halo is the much larger Surveyor crater, and the landing point is beyond it.  To the west of Surveyor is Head crater.  To the west of Halo are Bench crater and Sharp crater (now called Sharp-Apollo).

References

Impact craters on the Moon
Apollo 12